Olukayode Ishmael "Kayode" Odejayi (born 21 February 1982) is a Nigerian professional footballer who plays as a striker, most recently for Guiseley. He is a former Nigeria international.

Club career
Born in Ibadan, Oyo State, Odejayi started his career as a trainee at Bristol City and then moved on to Football Conference side Forest Green Rovers in 2002. 2002–03 turned out to be one of Rovers' best ever season since their foundation in 1890, and Odejayi was a key figure, scoring 13 goals as the club finished ninth.

Cheltenham Town
Bobby Gould signed Odejayi in the summer of the 2002/03 season for Cheltenham Town. His first two seasons were a struggle but in his third season (2005–06) he played almost every game as Cheltenham went on to reach the play-off final, winning 1–0 against fancied Grimsby Town. He came to national attention in January 2006 when Cheltenham faced Newcastle United in the FA Cup 4th round. Odejayi gained plaudits after the game and he was linked with a move to Championship team Plymouth Argyle however the move never materialised.

Barnsley
On 31 May 2007, Odejayi moved to Barnsley for a fee of £200,000, a Cheltenham record for a sale of a player. Forest Green Rovers received a windfall from the transfer as part of the terms of Odejayi's Cheltenham deal.

He scored in the Reds' first friendly against Morecambe in a 2–1 defeat. He then bagged a brace against Portuguese side Louletano DC in a 3–2 win. In a 3–1 victory against Buxton he bagged his fourth goal in three.

Odejayi netted his first competitive goal for Barnsley against Scunthorpe United which effectively sealed a 2–0 victory for the Reds.

Odejayi was booed off by his own fans against Southampton, after he missed a string of chances at goal. He himself admitted about his poor performances and promised the fans he would step it up and he did in the FA Cup, scoring of one of the most important goals in the club history when he secured a 1–0 victory at Oakwell, in the quarter finals of the FA Cup 2008 against Chelsea. On 6 April 2008 in the FA Cup semi-final against Cardiff City he missed an absolute sitter to score when he was put clean through on goal only to shoot wide, costing Barnsley the chance to equalise and possibly reach the FA Cup Final for the first time since 1912.

In January 2009, there was talk of him being pursued by Barnsley's South Yorkshire neighbours, Rotherham United.

Scunthorpe United (loan)
On 26 February he was loaned to Scunthorpe. He played in 6 games scoring 1 goal against Walsall.

Colchester United (loan)
He was loaned to Colchester United on 16 September 2009 on a three-month emergency loan. He made a big impression at the Weston Homes Community Stadium, winning two penalties in his first game against Hartlepool United and then scoring a brace against high flying Charlton Athletic. He also went on to score against Huddersfield Town, Leyton Orient, Wycombe Wanderers, Bromley and Oldham Athletic.

He set up John-Joe O'Toole's first Colchester goal in a 1–1 draw at Tranmere Rovers, whilst Odejayi also assisted Simon Hackney's goal against Bromley in the FA Cup. His loan spell ended on 19 December with him having scored seven goals in sixteen games, six of which came in the Football League. When the January transfer window opened, Odejayi's loan form resulted in him being signed by Aidy Boothroyd on a permanent deal, thus also becoming Aidy's first permanent signing for Colchester United.

Colchester United
On 24 December 2009 it was announced that Odejayi had signed for an undisclosed fee on a deal that would end in June 2012. Odejayi scored his first goal as a full-time Colchester player in a 2–1 win against Carlisle where he came off the bench to score the winner in stoppage time to keep the U's in their promotion hunt. He added two further goals against Bristol Rovers and Yeovil before getting an injury after coming on as a sub against Walsall. Odejayi was named as Colchester United's official player-of-the-season for the 2011–12 season, having led the front-line with power and strength all campaign.

Rotherham United
On 15 May, Rotherham United completed the much-rumoured signing of Odejayi after talks with Steve Evans. He joined the Millers officially on 1 July. His first goal for the club came in the 3–0 win against Burton Albion on 18 August 2012, this was also the opening day of the New York Stadium, and, on his league debut for the club. His second came soon after to gain a point against Chesterfield, on 25 August 2012. However, only 5 goals all season grew to fans frustration as Alex Revell and Daniel Nardiello became the preferred striking partnership.

On 10 September 2013, Odejayi joined League Two side Accrington Stanley on a three-month loan. On 1 January 2014, the loan was extended till the end of the 2013–14 League Two season.

Tranmere Rovers
On 26 June 2014, following Odejayi's departure from Rotherham United, he signed a one-year deal with Tranmere Rovers. At the end of the season, that saw Tranmere Rovers relegate out of League Two, Odejayi was released by the club.

Stockport County
Following Odejayi's release from Tranmere, he signed for National League North side Stockport County on 15 July 2015.

Guiseley
In July 2017 he signed for Guiseley.

International career
In May 2008, Odejayi made his first appearance for the Nigerian national team, coming on as a second-half substitute in a 1–1 friendly draw against Austria.

Career statistics

Club

International

Honours
Cheltenham Town
Football League Two play-offs: 2005–06

Rotherham United
Football League Two runners-up: 2012–13

Individual
Colchester United Player of the Year: 2011–12

References

External links

1982 births
Living people
Sportspeople from Ibadan
Yoruba sportspeople
Nigerian footballers
Nigeria international footballers
Association football forwards
Expatriate footballers in England
Bristol City F.C. players
Forest Green Rovers F.C. players
Cheltenham Town F.C. players
Barnsley F.C. players
Scunthorpe United F.C. players
Colchester United F.C. players
Rotherham United F.C. players
Accrington Stanley F.C. players
Tranmere Rovers F.C. players
Stockport County F.C. players
English Football League players
National League (English football) players
Guiseley A.F.C. players